This is a list of chapters for the Tau Beta Pi (TBP) engineering honor society. Listed by state is the chapter's designation, school, charter year and location. Sigma Tau was merged into TBP in 1974.

Alabama

Alaska

Arizona

Arkansas

California

Colorado

Connecticut

Delaware

District of Columbia

Florida

Georgia

Hawaii
Hawaii is the only state without a chapter.

Idaho

Illinois

Indiana

Iowa

Kansas

Kentucky

Louisiana

Maine

Maryland

Massachusetts

Michigan

Minnesota

Mississippi

Missouri

Montana

Nebraska

Nevada

New Hampshire

New Jersey

New Mexico

New York

North Carolina

North Dakota

Ohio

Oklahoma

Oregon

Pennsylvania

Puerto Rico

Rhode Island

South Carolina

South Dakota

Tennessee

Texas

Utah

Vermont

Virginia

Washington

West Virginia

Wisconsin

Wyoming

Notes

See also
 Tau Beta Pi

Lists of chapters of United States student societies by society
 chapters